The 1st (United Kingdom) Division is an active infantry division of the British Army. It has been formed and disestablished numerous times between 1809 and the present. In its original incarnation, as the 1st Division, it took part in the Peninsular War (part of the Coalition Wars of the Napoleonic Wars) before being disbanded in 1814, only to be re-formed the following year for service in the War of the Seventh Coalition and fought at the Battle of Waterloo. It remained active, as part of the British occuaption of France, until it was disbanded in 1818 when the British military withdrew. It was then raised as needed and served in the Crimean War, the Anglo-Zulu War, and the Second Boer War. In 1902, the British Army formed several permanent divisions, which included the 1st Division. It went on to fight in the First World War, made various deployments during the interwar period, and then took part in the Second World War (by then known as the 1st Infantry Division). 

In the post-war period, the division was deployed to Mandatory Palestine on internal security operations during the Jewish insurgency. In 1948, when all British troops left, the division transferred to Tripoli, Libya, which was then under occupation by Anglo-French forces following the conclusion of the Second World War. With rising tension in Egypt, the division was moved there to defend the Suez Canal. It remained until 1955 when it was withdrawn to the UK, as Britain removed its military from the area. The stay in the UK was short as there was little need for an additional divisional headquarters, and the division was disbanded on 30 June 1960. The following day, it was reformed as the 1st Division (by the renaming of the 5th Division) in Germany and served as part of the British Army of the Rhine and helped pioneer new tactics. On 1 April 1978, the name was again changed, and the division became the 1st Armoured Division.

The 1st Armoured Division went on to fight in the Gulf War before returning to Germany. With the end of the Cold War, the British government released the Options for Change plan, which ultimately saw the division disbanded by the end of 1992. The division was revived the next year, as the 1st (United Kingdom) Armoured Division, when the 4th Armoured Division was redesignated. The division took part in the peacekeeping operations in Bosnia and in the 2000s took part in the Iraq War. In 2014, the division relocated from Germany to the UK and was then renamed as the 1st (United Kingdom) Division.

Divisional history 1809–1945

The 1st Division was formed on 18 June 1809, by Lieutenant-General Arthur Wellesley, commander of British forces in Spain and Portugal, for service during the Peninsular War. After the conclusion of the War of the Sixth Coalition, the division was broken-up in France and its troops dispersed to the UK or were sent to North America to take part in the ongoing War of 1812. It was reformed the following year, when the War of the Seventh Coalition began and it subsequently fought at the battles of Quatre Bras and Waterloo. The latter notably saw the division help repulse the final attack of the day, which had been launched by the French Imperial Guard. With the end of the war, the division formed part of the Army of Occupation that was located in France. It remained there until December 1818, when it was disbanded upon the British withdrawal and the end of the occupation.

During the mid- to late-19th century, several formations bearing the name 1st Division were formed, each for a particular conflict. Per the division's official website, three such formations form part of its lineage. They fought in the Crimean War (1854–1856), the Anglo-Zulu War (1879), and the Second Boer War (1899–1900). In 1902, the division was reformed as a permanent part of the British Army and was stationed at Aldershot. In the following decade, it fought in the First World War (1914–1918) on the Western Front. While permanently stationed at Aldershot, the division did deploy troops throughout the interwar period. Soldiers were dispatched to take part in the Irish War of Independence, to reinforce the Occupation of Constantinople, to oversee the 1935 Saar status referendum and sent detachments to reinforce the British presence in Palestine during the Arab revolt. During the Second World War, the division took part in the Battle of France, the Tunisian and the Italian campaigns. In February 1945, the division was transferred to the Mandate of Palestine, where it ended the war.

Post War and Cold War

The 1st Infantry Division was based in Palestine, with the exception of the period December 1945–March 1946 when it moved to Egypt to reorganise, until May 1948. While located in the mandate, it was assigned to internal security operations during the Jewish insurgency, with troops deployed at Haifa, in Galilee, and more guarding the northern border. In May 1948, as part of the general British withdrawal from Palestine, the division left and relocated to Tripoli, Libya (at the time, occupied by Anglo-French forces). The stay in Libya lasted until November 1951, when the division moved to the Ismailia region of Egypt, becoming part of an 80-000 strong garrison assigned to defend the Suez Canal and to protect British interests in the Middle East. This came shortly after the Egyptian government abrogated the Anglo-Egyptian Treaty of 1936, which was the basis for British troops to remain in Egypt to defend the canal. The ensuing political landscape saw increased animosity to the British presence eventually resulting in an agreement to withdraw British troops. Accordingly, the division arrived in the UK in November 1955 and then formed the British Army's strategic reserve. However, it was used as a source of manpower for formations overseas and was never brought up to full strength. On 30 June 1960, as there was now no need for an additional divisional headquarters in the UK, the 1st Infantry Division was disbanded. 

The following day, 1 July 1960, the 5th Division was redesignated as the 1st Division. The name change also saw the continuation of the 1st Division's insignia, rather than the 5th Divisions. The reformed 1st Division was based at Verden an der Aller, Germany, and became part of the British Army of the Rhine (BAOR). At the end of the decade, the formation conducted divisional wide trials using the 'square brigade' concept. When they were deemed successful, in 1970, all brigades within the BAOR were reorganised in line with this concept. In the late 1960s, new anti-tank and defense in depth concepts were developed, as fears of a possible surprise attack by the Warsaw Pact grew within the BAOR. These new concepts were promoted by Major-General Edwin Bramall, when he took command of the 1st Division in January 1972. Bramall felt that there was an over reliance on the arrival of reinforcements to resist an offensive by the Soviet Union, rather than the BAOR being able to do so itself. Using the division, the new tactics were refined before being adopted by the BAOR and further worked on at a higher level in the mid-1970s.

During the 1970s, the UK had to reconcile its decreased resources with its commitments, as well as the increased threat from the Soviet Union. The 1975 Mason Review, a government white paper, outlined a new defence policy and called for BAOR to be restructured that also included the elimination of the brigade level of command. This political change allowed the BAOR to restructure based on the concepts that the 1st Division had pioneered. The BAOR increased to four divisions as a result, for the first time since the end of the 1950s, with each composed of two armoured regiments, three mechanised infantry battalions, and two artillery regiments. On 1 April 1978, the 1st Division was redesignated as the 1st Armoured Division. The 7th and the 11th Armoured Brigades became defunct and were replaced by Task Force Alpha and Task Force Bravo. It was intended that the division could form up to five battlegroups with each commanded by either an armoured regiment or an infantry battalion. These groups were to be formed for a specific task and allocated the required forces needed. The reforms intended that the divisional commander would oversee these battlegroups, but early training showed this to be impractical. To compensate, the divisional headquarters was increased to 750 men (wartime strength) including two brigadiers, who would each command a flexible task force that would be formed by the general officer commanding (GOC). The task force approach allowed the GOC to tailor his forces to meet unforeseen events and execute the new developed doctrine. These task forces were not a reintroduction of a brigade command structure, and they had no administrative responsibilities. In structuring the division in this manner, it allowed a reduction of 700 men. David John Anthony Stone, a historian, commented the system was "designed to allow the commander maximum flexibility and [to] take precise account of the operational or tactical task to be achieved". 

In 1981 John Nott, the Secretary of State for Defence for the government elected in 1979, announced the 1981 Defence White Paper. It, like the Mason Review, aimed to balance the British military in line with the nation's financial resources. Nott's paper called for the BAOR to be restructured from four armoured divisions of two brigades, into a force of three divisions of three brigades. The intent was to save manpower and money, while only losing one divisional headquarters. The task force concept was dropped, having been deemed to have not met expectations, and the division was reorganised in line with Nott's recommendations. It then commanded the 7th, 12th, and 22nd Armoured Brigades. Each brigade contained either two armoured regiments and one mechanised infantry battalion, or two mechanised infantry battalions and one armoured regiment. On 11 November 1983, the divisional insignia was changed. Major-General Brian Kenny decided to merge the current insignia with that used by the Second World War-era 1st Armoured Division. This combined the triangle and red outline with a charging rhino motif. Starting that year, the first Challenger 1 tanks were provided to the BAOR, to replace the Chieftain, and all armoured regiments had converted by the end of the decade.

Gulf War

The headquarters of the division was deployed to Saudi Arabia in 1990 to command British land forces in the Gulf War. It had the 4th Armoured Brigade and 7th Armoured Brigade under command. During the war, it came under the US VII Corps and was part of the great armoured left-hook that destroyed many Iraqi Republican Guard formations. The two brigades in the division alternated heading the advance. The division participated in the Battle of Norfolk. During this engagement it destroyed several companies of Iraqi T-55 tanks. After 48 hours of combat, the division destroyed or isolated four Iraqi infantry divisions (the 26th, 48th, 31st, and 25th) and overran the Iraqi 52nd Armoured Division in several sharp engagements. The division traveled 217 miles in 97 hours. It captured or destroyed about 300 tanks and a very large number of armoured personnel carriers, trucks, reconnaissance vehicles, etc. The division also took over 7,000 Iraqi prisoners of war including two division commanders and two other general officers.

End of the Cold War

Following the Iraqi defeat and liberation of Kuwait, the division returned to Germany in early 1991. Overlapping the Gulf War, was the collapse of the Soviet Union and the end of the Cold War. In July 1990, the British government announced Options for Change. This framework sought to restructure the British military based on the new strategic situation and allow for furher cost saving measures to be enacted. The military was to be decreased by 18 per cent (56,000) by the mid 1990s, with the BAOR to be cut in half. As part of this, the division was disbanded on 31 December 1992 and its headquarters became HQ Lower Saxony District.

Further restructuring took place within the BAOR and in July 1993, the 4th Armoured Division was retitled as the 1st (UK) Armoured Division. It then controlled the 4th, 7th, and 20th Armoured Brigades each with two mechanised infantry battalions and two armoured regiments equipped with Challenger tanks. The reformed formation maintained the 4th Division's HQ presence at Herford, with the rest of the division spread across various sites of the Westfalen Garrison area. Between 1992 and 1994, the 1st (British) Corps and BAOR were disbanded and replaced by the Allied Rapid Reaction Corps, a newly formed NATO HQ that was administered by the UK. The division came under its command and was deployed on a number of peacekeeping operations.

Most notably, in 1995, the Multi-National Division (South-West) was formed by the British Army, to support peacekeeping operations in Bosnia. Forces were drawn from the 1st Armoured Division and the 3 (UK) Division, with each headquarters controlling the division as their forces rotated through the command. This lasted until 1999, when force contributions changed and different commanders were selected from outside either division. Other peacekeeping operations included providing troops to Kosovo Force and the United Nations Peacekeeping Force in Cyprus. In addition to these efforts, detachments were also deployed to the Falkland Islands and Northern Ireland.

Iraq War

The Division headquarters again deployed to the Persian Gulf area in 2003. It again commanded British forces in the area, this time with three full brigades under its control. Those were 7th Armoured Brigade again, along with 16 Air Assault Brigade, and 3 Commando Brigade. In a combined arms operation, the division secured southern Iraq, including the city of Basra during the invasion. It came under I Marine Expeditionary Force during the 2003 conflict.

Current status

Under Army 2020, the division was renamed 1st (United Kingdom) Division in July 2014 and given responsibility for commanding the Adaptable Force; and then in June 2015, the divisional headquarters moved to Imphal Barracks in York.

Under the Future Soldier programme, the divisional headquarters will move from their current base at Imphal Barracks in York to Catterick Garrison not before 2028.  In addition, the 2nd Medical Brigade (to be reduced to 2nd Medical Group) and 1st Military Police Brigade (to be reduced to 1st Royal Military Provost Group) will both move under control of Commander Field Army.

Organisation
The brigades currently assigned to the division are:
4th Infantry Brigade and Headquarters North East, at Peronne Lines, Catterick Garrison
7th Infantry Brigade and Headquarters East, at Kendrew Barracks, Cottesmore
11th Security Force Assistance Brigade, at Roebuck House, Aldershot Garrison
51st Infantry Brigade and Headquarters Scotland, at Redford Barracks, Edinburgh
8th Engineer Brigade, at Gibraltar Barracks, Minley
102nd Logistic Brigade, at Prince William of Gloucester Barracks, Grantham
2nd Medical Brigade, at Queen Elizabeth Barracks, Strensall
1st Military Police Brigade, at Marlborough Lines, Andover (since 1 December 2020)

See also

 List of commanders of the British 1st Division
 List of Victoria Cross recipients from the British 1st Division
 British Forces Germany

Notes

Footnotes

Citations

References

Further reading

External links

 
 
 

Armoured divisions of the British Army in World War II
British armoured divisions
British forces in Germany
1939 establishments in the United Kingdom
Military units and formations of the British Empire in World War II
Military units and formations established in 1960